Martha M. Masters is a fictional character on the Fox medical drama television series House. Masters is portrayed by American actress Amber Tamblyn. She appears in a multi-episode arc of season 7, and very briefly in the series finale, "Everybody Dies".

Biography
After graduating from high school at age 15,  Masters obtained doctorate degrees in both applied math and art history. In the episode "Office Politics", Dr. Lisa Cuddy hires Masters, a medical student, for the position on Dr. House's diagnostic team left vacant by Thirteen. House once described Masters as having "nervous, anxious energy" when describing the list of candidates Taub had to pick from to study with when being re-certified by the American Board of Internal Medicine (ABIM). In the episode "Family Practice", House threatens to have Masters thrown out of medical school if she tells Cuddy or her mother's physician about switching her medication. Despite this, she informs both groups and still retains her job. In the episode of "Last Temptation" she leaves House.

Masters makes her final appearance in the series finale "Everybody Dies".

Personality
Masters appears to be reserved and awkward to her colleagues and is easily intimidated by them. Tamblyn believes that she may have Asperger's. She has a strong moral compass and refuses to lie to staff or patients, which means she is frequently at odds with Dr. House. Tamblyn opines that Masters "believes so strongly in the ethics of truth telling, to the point of a fault. Just in the same way that [House] believes so much in lying". Tamblyn also compares her character to Cuddy, stating that "I do think Martha is a young Cuddy, an extremist version of Cuddy".

The character is based on Tamblyn's friend of the same name; in an interview, Tamblyn described that "my character is based on my real-life best friend, who is a med student and whose real name is Martha Masters. In fact, they made her sign a release that she wouldn't sue Fox."

References

External links 
 Martha Masters at TVIV.org

House (TV series) characters
Fictional physicians
Television characters introduced in 2010
Fictional medical students
Fictional female doctors